The box battery disposition of the main armament in a battleship was commonly used in ships built in the latter half of the 19th century; it was an interim disposition between full-length broadside guns and turret-mounted artillery.

Description 
From the first time that artillery was carried aboard warships, in the early Tudor period, until the middle of the 19th century, warships had carried their cannon in long rows along their sides. Bigger ships had carried more and bigger cannon, culminating in wooden line-of-battle ships carrying some 140 muzzle-loading smoothbore cannon, 70 on each side.

With the advent of steam power, iron armour, and vastly larger guns, first-line battleships built from 1860 onwards tended to carry fewer but heavier guns. She carried a relatively small number of guns compared to the wooden ships that preceded her, but could have destroyed any of them in combat. Warrior carried twenty guns on each side. As artillery manufacturers produced heavier and  heavier guns, warships carried fewer and fewer of them. The ultimate designs of broadside ironclads allowed for only ten or twelve heavy guns to be carried.

A ship at sea moves in response to the waves it encounters; the ends move more than the centre. It followed that if a warship were to mount only a small number of guns, it would make sense to mount them centrally, where the movement of the ship was minimal. Having mounted the artillery in this central position, it also made sense to concentrate the armour of the ship around the guns, along with the engines and the command centre. It was felt unnecessary to armour the ends, superstructure, or the funnels. A central battery, surrounded by thick armour, became known as a box battery.

See also 
 Central battery ship

References

Battleships
Naval artillery